Djeny Bembo-Leta (born 9 November 1991) is a Congolese professional footballer who plays as a forward.

Career

Oldham Athletic
Bembo-Leta made his debut on 1 September 2009 for Oldham Athletic in their 2–1 home defeat to Accrington Stanley in the Football League Trophy, replacing Kieran Lee in the 85th minute as a substitute.

In April 2010 he was awarded his first professional contract, a two-year deal.

He made his second appearance for the team on 10 August 2010 in a League Cup match against Scunthorpe, where he scored his first senior goal.

He made his Football League debut on 14 August 2010 in the 3–0 win over Notts County.

He was released by Oldham at the end of the 2011–12 season, along with eight other players.

Stalybridge Celtic (loan)
In the January transfer window of 2012, Bembo-Leta joined Stalybridge Celtic on loan for the rest of the season.

Radcliffe Borough
In October 2012 he joined Radcliffe Borough.

Northwich Victoria
The following month he joined Northwich Victoria.

Floriana
He then moved to Malta, appearing for Floriana.

Wolfsdonk
Following on from this, he moved to Belgium, joining Wolfsdonk.

Droylsden
In October 2013 he joined Droylsden.

Buxton
In 2015 he joined Buxton.

In a match for Buxton against Blyth Spartans in 2016, Buxton history was made when he and his twin, Fabrice came off the bench to join their brother, Joel, to become the first trio of siblings to appear for the club in a game.

Droylsden
In March 2016 he rejoined Droylsden.

Personal life
He has two brothers, one of which is a twin, Fabrice; and the other, Joel, who both of whom also played for teams at Oldham Athletic but who have since been released. Fabrice was released by Stalybridge Celtic after being remanded in custody in August 2011, accused of involvement in looting during the 2011 England riots. He was later jailed for 32 months.

Career statistics

References

External links
Oldham Athletic profile

1991 births
Living people
Footballers from Kinshasa
Republic of the Congo footballers
Republic of the Congo expatriate footballers
Oldham Athletic A.F.C. players
Stalybridge Celtic F.C. players
Radcliffe F.C. players
Northwich Victoria F.C. players
Buxton F.C. players
Expatriate footballers in Malta
Expatriate footballers in Belgium
Floriana F.C. players
Droylsden F.C. players
English Football League players
Association football forwards
21st-century Democratic Republic of the Congo people